Anatoliy Fyodorovich Byshovets (born 23 April 1946) is a Soviet and Russian football manager of Ukrainian origin and former Soviet international striker. He played his entire professional career with club side Dynamo Kyiv. He won Olympic gold medal as a coach with the Soviet team at the 1988 Summer Olympics. He was also a manager of the USSR, Russia, and South Korea national teams. At the 1996 Atlanta Olympics, he managed the South Korean U-23 team. He is one of the most successful modern Russian coaches.

Player
Byshovets played for the youth team of FC Dynamo Kyiv, then for their senior team in 1963–1973. Byshovets won the Soviet championship four times (1966, 1967, 1968, 1971) and the Soviet Cup twice (1964, 1966) with them. Byshovets scored four goals for the Soviet Union in the 1970 FIFA World Cup.

Coach
After finishing his playing career in 1973 Byshovets worked in Dynamo Kyiv's football school. In 1988, he won the Olympic gold medal with the Soviet team. He has also managed various clubs and three national teams (USSR, Russia, and South Korea).

Byshovets also was a consultant at Anzhi Makhachkala (2003), vice president at FC Khimki (2003–2004), and sporting director at Hearts (2004–2005). He became the first foreign coach of South Korea in 1994.

Recent events
After having been for one year out of work Byshovets became coach of FC Lokomotiv Moscow of the Russian Premier League. In 2007, Lokomotiv with Byshovets won the Russian Cup which brought Byshovets a more positive image from both the press and the fans. But despite the club's Champions League ambitions under Byshovets, Lokomotiv was underachieving in the Russian Premier League. Next day after the end of 2007 season he was sacked.

In October 2009, he was hired as a consultant by FC Kuban Krasnodar. He left Kuban just over a month later, on 17 November 2009, and the club was subsequently disbanded.

References

External links

 
 Profile at zenit-history.ru
 
 

1946 births
Living people
Footballers from Kyiv
Communist Party of the Soviet Union members
Russian people of Ukrainian descent
Soviet footballers
Soviet Union international footballers
Soviet Union national football team managers
Soviet football managers
Ukrainian football managers
Russian football managers
Russia national football team managers
Expatriate football managers in Cyprus
Ukrainian expatriate sportspeople in Cyprus
Expatriate football managers in South Korea
Ukrainian expatriate sportspeople in South Korea
Expatriate football managers in Portugal
Ukrainian expatriate sportspeople in Portugal
Expatriate football managers in Russia
Ukrainian expatriate sportspeople in Russia
South Korea national football team managers
AEL Limassol managers
C.S. Marítimo managers
FC Zenit Saint Petersburg managers
UEFA Euro 1992 managers
UEFA Euro 1968 players
1970 FIFA World Cup players
Soviet Top League players
FC Dynamo Kyiv players
FC Shakhtar Donetsk managers
FC Lokomotiv Moscow managers
FC Dynamo Moscow managers
Russian Premier League managers
FC Tom Tomsk managers
Ukrainian Premier League managers
Merited Coaches of the Soviet Union
Merited Coaches of Ukraine
Honoured Masters of Sport of the USSR
Recipients of the Order of Honour (Russia)
Recipients of the Order of the Red Banner of Labour
Association football forwards
Russian expatriate football managers
Ukrainian expatriate football managers